U Sports (stylized as U SPORTS) is the national sport governing body of university sport in Canada, comprising the majority of degree-granting universities in the country. Its equivalent body for organized sports at colleges in Canada is the Canadian Collegiate Athletic Association (CCAA). Some institutions are members of both bodies for different sports.

Its name until October 20, 2016, was Canadian Interuniversity Sport (CIS). On that date, the organization rebranded as "U Sports" in both official languages.

The original Canadian Interuniversity Athletic Union (CIAU) Central was founded in 1906 and existed until 1955, composed only of universities from Ontario and Quebec. With the collapse of the CIAU Central in the mid-1950s, calls for a new, national governing body for university sport accelerated. Once the Royal Military College of Canada became a degree granting institution, Major W. J. (Danny) McLeod, athletic director at the RMC directed the establishment of the Canadian Intercollegiate Athletic Union (CIAU) in 1961. Major McLeod ran the CIAU from his office at RMC as the first CIAU Secretary-Treasurer. In the 1960s the CIAU functioned as a voluntary, autonomous, educational sport organization which represented by the various universities from coast to coast. In 1978, the Canadian Women's Interuniversity Athletic Union (CWIAU), which had formed in 1970, merged with the CIAU; the expanded CIAU reinforced its university focus by adjusting its name to the Canadian Interuniversity Athletics Union. It changed its name to Canadian Interuniversity Sport (CIS) in June 2001 due to growing misconceptions about the name of the organization since the term "athletics" was associated with track and field and "union" with labour movements.

According to the organization, the name change to "U Sports" came about in part due to a desire for a brand that was "instantly recognizable and identical in both French and English." The rebrand was accompanied by a new approach to presentation of Canadian University sports, its teams, and its players. The new, singular logo and name came with a new website to better present stories taking place throughout the athletics programs U Sports governs, bolstered by a new approach to social media.

Sanctioned sports 
Source: 
 Basketball
 Cross country
 Curling
 Field hockey (women's only)
 Football (men's only)
 Ice hockey
 Rugby union (women's only)
 Soccer
 Swimming
 Track and field
 Volleyball
 Wrestling

2016 rebrand 
On October 20, 2016, CIS announced that it would be changing its name to U Sports, accompanied by a new logo and approach to Canadian University sports. The name was chosen in part to better represent Canada as a bilingual nation with a united name as opposed to separate acronyms. The new name and look are also intended to increase the marketability of Canadian University sports.

Signifying a major shift in the presentation of Canadian University sports, U Sports aims to better engage with Canadian sports fans and present the athletes it governs. To do so, U Sports aims to promote the stories of its key athletes through a new approach to social media as well as a new website in order to "create a massive change in the way Canadians see university sports in the digital era".

Athletic funding 
The U Sports member institutions offer athletic scholarships known as Athletic Financial Awards (AFA); subject to minimum academic requirements. The AFA's are capped and may not exceed the value of the tuition and compulsory fees for the student-athlete. Universities also may provide additional non-athletic awards including academic scholarships and needs-based grants for athletes in addition to this cap, provided the additional awards do not include athletic criteria. In 2008/2009 one in two U Sports athletes was receiving an athletic scholarship.

Increasingly, U Sports schools are offering booster-support programs, where alumni, parents and/or corporations can donate money to a targeted fund especially designed to off-set a student-athlete's tuition and living costs. The University of Windsor has an Adopt-A-Lancer program, for example. U Sports has no regulations regarding how much each school can provide to teams through private support. The Université Laval's Rouge et Or football team, winner of seven of the last 12 Vanier Cups, is so successful with fund raising that the team trains in Florida during the spring.

Canadian Hockey League teams offer financial support for their graduates – who attend school within two years of playing major junior – who choose to play for a U Sports school after graduating from major junior hockey based on a model where the league will give scholarships commensurate with the seasons they played in the CHL. 

Hockey players who play in the CHL are ineligible for NCAA athletic scholarships, although many attend a CHL training camp: however, they can only stay a maximum of 48 hours, and can not dress in any games.

Championships
Source:
Fall sports
Week 1 is the 9th Saturday following Labour Day Monday

Week 1
U Sports women's field hockey championship
U Sports women's rugby championship

Week 2
U Sports men's soccer championship
U Sports women's soccer championship
U Sports men's cross country championship
U Sports women's cross country championship

Week 3
U Sports men's football semi-final 
U Sports men's football semi-final

Week 4
U Sports men's football championshipWinter sports
Week 1 is the 25th Saturday following Labour Day Monday

Week 1
U Sports men's swimming championship
U Sports women's swimming championship
U Sports men's wrestling championship
U Sports women's wrestling championship

Week 3
U Sports men's basketball championship
U Sports women's basketball championship
U Sports men's track and field championship
U Sports women's track and field championship

Week 4
U Sports men's ice hockey championship
U Sports women's ice hockey championship
U Sports men's volleyball championship 
U Sports women's volleyball championship

Week 5
U Sports men's curling championship
U Sports women's curling championship

Members 
There are 56 member universities in U Sports. These 56 member universities are currently organized into the four following regional associations. In some of these sports, these associations are sometimes referred to as conferences.

Atlantic University Sport (AUS)
Canada West Universities Athletic Association (CW)
Ontario University Athletics (OUA)
Réseau du sport étudiant du Québec (RSEQ)

Notes

Basketball 

As of the 2019–2020 U Sports season, 48 of the 56 member institutions have both men's and women's basketball teams. In sports with heavy university participation, like basketball, some of the conferences have had divisions. The OUA previously had four divisions from 2014–15 to 2016–17, but reduced them back to two for the 2017–18 season. With the addition of Ontario Tech for the 2019–20 season, OUA moved to three six-team divisions. Canada West had two divisions, but reverted to a one conference format for the 2016–17 season with 17 teams. The AUS conference has eight teams while the RSEQ conference has five.

The U Sports men's and women's basketball teams are organized in the following way:

Football 

27 of the 56 member schools participated in the 2019 U Sports football season. As of the 2017–18 academic year, the two U Sports members in Sherbrooke compete in separate leagues in football only. Bishop's football moved from RSEQ to AUS, and Sherbrooke remains in RSEQ football.

Men's ice hockey

35 of the 56 member schools participated in the 2019–20 Men's Ice Hockey season.

Women's ice hockey

34 of the 56 member schools participated in the 2019–20 Women's Ice Hockey season. The Bishop's Gaiters will join the RSEQ and start play in 2020–21 and the Trinity Western Spartans and MacEwan Griffins will join Canada West.

Men's soccer 

48 of the 56 member schools participated in the 2019 Men's soccer season.

Women's soccer 

53 of the 56 member schools participated in the 2019 Women's soccer season.

Men's volleyball 

30 of the 56 member schools participated in the 2019–20 Men's volleyball season. After Memorial disbanded their team following the 2016–17 season, two teams competed in the AUS with three competing in the RSEQ, before Dalhousie and UNB moved to the RSEQ with the AUS dropping men's volleyball as a varsity sport. 12 teams compete in Canada West and another 13 compete in the OUA, which is split between an East and a West division.

Women's volleyball 

39 of the 56 member schools participated in the 2019–20 Women's volleyball season. Six teams compete in the AUS and six in the RSEQ. Another 14 compete in the OUA, split between an East and a West division, and the Canada West conference has 13 women's volleyball teams.

See also 

 National Collegiate Athletic Association (NCAA), the American equivalent of U Sports.
 List of colleges in Canada
 List of universities in Canada
 Athletics Canada
 Canada Basketball
 College basketball
 Canadian Soccer Association
 College soccer
 Football Canada
 College football
 Hockey Canada
 College hockey
 Royal Canadian Golf Association
 Canadian Collegiate Athletic Association
 International University Sports Federation
 Universiade

Notes and references

External links

 

 
1906 establishments in Canada
College and university associations and consortia in Canada
Sports governing bodies in Canada
College sports governing bodies in Canada
Sports organizations established in 1906
Student sports governing bodies